The Javan tailless fruit bat (Megaerops kusnotoi) is a species of megabat in the family Pteropodidae. It is endemic to Indonesia.

The consumption of bushmeat, meat from undomesticated animals, is a big ecological problem in Indonesia, and a threat to bat biodiversity. "Locals eat bats at least once a month, but the frequency increases tenfold around Christian holidays. Approximately 500 metric tons of bats are imported from other provinces, with South Sulawesi, Indonesia as the main provider at 38%." These high levels of excessive hunting and consumption of bats has made them become the most endangered species in Indonesia.

References

Megaerops
Bats of Indonesia
Fauna of Java
Endemic fauna of Indonesia
Vulnerable fauna of Asia
Mammals described in 1978
Taxonomy articles created by Polbot